Jared Elliott is an American football coach. He is currently the pass game coordinator and tight ends coach at Ball State. He served as the head football coach at Western Illinois University from 2018 to 2021, compiling a record of 9–31.

Head coaching record

References

External links
 Western Illinois profile

Year of birth missing (living people)
Living people
American football quarterbacks
American football wide receivers
Carthage Firebirds football coaches
Miami RedHawks football coaches
Miami RedHawks football players
Missouri Southern Lions football coaches
North Carolina Central Eagles football coaches
Western Illinois Leathernecks football coaches
People from Franklin, Tennessee
Coaches of American football from Tennessee
Players of American football from Tennessee